Lytopylus is a genus of parasitoid wasps in the family Braconidae. As members of the subfamily Agathidinae, they are koinobiont endoparasitoids of caterpillars. This genus is primarily found in the neotropics, but ranges from the northeastern United States to Argentina. There are 39 species of Lytopylus, and many more undescribed.

References 

Braconidae